John Kirkman (1741 – 19 September 1780) was an English politician.

At the general election in September 1780, Kirkman was elected as one of the 4 MPs for the City of London. However, he died on 19 September 1780, the day when the polls closed. A by-election was held in November, which was won by John Sawbridge, one of the two MPs defeated in London at the general election.

References

1741 births
1780 deaths
Members of the Parliament of Great Britain for English constituencies
Members of Parliament for the City of London
British MPs 1780–1784
Politicians elected posthumously